Trichechidae is a family of sirenians that includes all living manatees and several extinct genera.

Systematics
TRICHECHIDAE
Miosireninae
Anomotherium
Anomotherium langewieschei
Miosiren
Miosiren canhami
Miosiren kocki
Trichechinae
Trichechus
Trichechus inunguis - Amazonian Manatee
Trichechus manatus - West Indian Manatee
Trichechus senegalensis - African Manatee
Trichechus hesperamazonicus
Potamosiren
Potamosiren magdalensis
Ribodon
Ribodon limbatus

References

Mammal families
Taxa named by Theodore Gill
Sirenians